Josh Gordy (born February 9, 1987) is an American football cornerback who is currently a free agent. He was signed by the Jacksonville Jaguars as an undrafted free agent in 2010. He played college football at Central Michigan.

Gordy has also been a member of the Green Bay Packers, St. Louis Rams, and Indianapolis Colts. With the Packers, Gordy won Super Bowl XLV against the Pittsburgh Steelers.

College career
Gordy played college football for Central Michigan University, where he had ten career interceptions as a cornerback. He earned All Mid-American Conference honors as a senior while helping CMU win three Mid-American Conference championships in four seasons, and finish in the Top 25 in the nation in the final January 2010 AP Poll and USA Today Coaches Poll.

Professional career

Jacksonville Jaguars
After playing at Central Michigan University, Gordy went undrafted and signed as a free agent with the Jacksonville Jaguars. He would only spend his time with the Jaguars as an offseason member of their secondary.

Green Bay Packers
Gordy then signed with the Green Bay Packers and spent time on and off of their practice squad and the team for much of the 2010 season. In his 2010 stint with the Packers, Gordy earned his first Super Bowl ring.

St. Louis Rams
After spending time with the Packers, the St. Louis Rams signed Gordy off of Green Bay's practice squad in 2011 due to many injuries in their secondary. Gordy was then given numerous starting opportunities. He would then set up somewhat of a breakout campaign for himself, recording three interceptions in limited time in the Rams defensive backfield.

Indianapolis Colts
During training camp in 2012, the St. Louis Rams went from having a need for cornerbacks, to having crowded depth at the position. Therefore, after a solid 2011 campaign coming off the bench with the Rams, Gordy was traded to the Indianapolis Colts on August 22, 2012. He would then spend most of his year with the Colts contributing his play on special teams. Gordy was a restricted free agent after the 2013-14 season ended. On April 21, 2014, he signed a qualifying offer from the Colts.

New York Giants
Gordy signed with the New York Giants on April 14, 2015. On August 29, 2015, Gordy suffered a hip injury during the third preseason game against the New York Jets. On September 1, 2015, he was placed on injured reserve by the Giants. On September 23, 2015, Gordy was released by the Giants with an injury settlement.

References

External links
 Green Bay Packers bio
 St.Louis Rams bio

1987 births
Living people
Players of American football from Georgia (U.S. state)
American football cornerbacks
Central Michigan Chippewas football players
Jacksonville Jaguars players
Green Bay Packers players
St. Louis Rams players
Indianapolis Colts players
New York Giants players